Queen Jeongan (정안왕후 김씨, 22 January 1355 – 2 August 1412) or Queen Anjeong (안정왕후), of the Gyeongju Kim clan, was a posthumous name bestowed to the wife and queen consort of Yi Gyeong, King Jeongjong; the second monarch of the Korean Joseon Dynasty. She was queen consort of Joseon from 1398 until her husband's abdication in 1400 and honoured as Queen Deok (덕비), after which she was honoured as Queen Dowager Sundeok (순덕왕대비).

Biography

Early life 
Lady Kim was born during King Gongmin of Goyreo’s 4th year of reign on 22 January 1355 into the Gyeongju Kim clan as the eldest daughter of Kim Cheon-seo and Lady Lee of the Damyang Lee clan. Lady Kim had an older brother and six younger siblings.

It is unknown what year she married Yi Bang-gwa, the second son of Yi Seong-gye and Lady Han.

Royal life 
In 1398, at the age of 42-43, she became Crown Princess Consort Deok when her husband, Prince Yeongan (the future King Jeongjong), became Crown Prince. Her father was given the royal title of “Internal Prince Wolseong, Kim Cheon-seo” (월성부원군 김천서, 月城府院君 金天瑞), and her mother was given the royal title of “Internal Princess Consort Samhanguk of the Damyang Lee clan” (삼한국대부인 담양 이씨, 三韓國大夫人 潭陽 李氏).

She was then referred as “Queen Consort Deok" (덕비; Deokbi meaning Virtuous Consort) from the 5 September 1398 until her husband’s abdication.

In the aftermath of the Second Strife of Princes when her husband abdicated in favor of his younger brother, Yi Bang-won, Prince Jeongan on 28 November 1400, along with him being bestowed the courtesy title of "King Emeritus Inmungongye" (인문공예상왕), she was bestowed the courtesy title of "Queen Dowager Sundeok" (순덕왕대비, Sundeok-Wangdaebi) by her royal brother-in-law.

Death and posthumous title 
Queen Deok later died on 2 August 1412 during her brother-in-law’s, King Taejong, reign. Her husband outlived her by seven years and both are buried within Hureung in Heunggyo-myeon, Kaepung County, North Hwanghae Province, North Korea. She had no issue with King Jeongjong.

She was given the posthumous title of Queen Jeongan (정안왕후, 定安王后), but was also given another lesser-known posthumous title "Queen Anjeong" (안정왕후, 安定王后).

In 1681, 270 years after her death, King Sukjong added Onmyeongjangui (온명장의, 溫明莊懿) to her posthumous title.

Family
Parent

 Father — Kim Cheon-seo (김천서, 金天瑞)
 Grandfather — Kim Moon-jung (김문중, 金文仲)
 Grandmother — Lady Yun (정부인 윤씨, 貞夫人 尹氏)
 Mother — Internal Princess Consort Samhanguk of the Damyang Lee clan (삼한국대부인 담양 이씨, 三韓國大夫人 潭陽 李氏)
 Grandfather — Lee Ye (이예, 李藝)
 Grandmother — Lady Yu of the Munhwa Yu clan (정부인 문화 유씨, 貞夫人 文化 柳氏)
 Uncle — Lee Gwang-shin (이광신, 李光臣)
 Unnamed uncle

Sibling

 Older brother — Kim Seok-joon (김석준, 金釋俊)
 Younger brother — Kim Su (김수, 金需) (1338 - 1409)
 Nephew — Kim Gyeom (김겸, 金謙)
 Younger sister — Lady Kim of the Gyeongju Kim clan (경주 김씨, 慶州 金氏)
 Younger brother — Kim Sam-won (김삼원, 金三原) 
 Younger sister — Lady Kim of the Gyeongju Kim clan (경주 김씨, 慶州 金氏)
 Brother-in-law - Yi Gwing, Prince Yeoyang (이굉 여양군, 李宏)
 Younger sister — Lady Kim of the Gyeongju Kim clan (경주 김씨, 慶州 金氏)
 Brother-in-law - No Yeong-guk (노영국, 盧永國)
 Younger sister — Lady Kim of the Gyeongju Kim clan (경주 김씨, 慶州 金氏)
 Brother-in-law - Yun Yu-rin (윤유린, 尹有麟) of the Papyeong Yun clan

Consort

 Husband — King Jeongjong of Joseon (18 July 1357 – 15 October 1419) (조선 정종) — No issue.
 Mother-in-law — Queen Shinui of the Anbyeon Han clan (신의왕후 안변 한씨, 神懿王后 安邊 韓氏) (1333 - 21 October 1391)
 Father-in-law — King Taejo of Joseon (태조대왕, 太祖大王) (27 October 1335 - 18 June 1408)
 Brother-in-law — Yi Bang-woo, Prince Jinan (진안대군 방우, 鎭安大君 芳雨) (1354 - 1393)
 Brother-in-law — Yi Ui, Prince Ikan (익안대군 방의, 益安大君 芳毅) (1360 - 1404)
 Brother-in-law — Yi Bang-gan, Prince Hoean (회안대군 방간, 懷安大君 芳幹) (1364 - 1421)
 Brother-in-law — King Taejong of Joseon (태종대왕, 太宗大王) (1367 - 1422). Wife: Queen Wongyeong of the Yeoheung Min clan (원경왕후 민씨, 元敬王后 閔氏) (1365 - 1420)

In popular culture
 Portrayed by Kim Hae-sook in the 1983 MBC TV series The King of Chudong Palace.
 Portrayed by Park Yun-seon in the 1996-1998 KBS TV series Tears of the Dragon.
 Portrayed by Kim Seo-yeon in the 2021-2022 KBS TV series The King of Tears, Lee Bang-won

References

External links
 

1355 births
1412 deaths
Royal consorts of the Joseon dynasty
Korean queens consort
14th-century Korean women
15th-century Korean women